Beautiful Despair is the twelfth studio album by English band Television Personalities. The album was originally recorded in 1990 on a 4-track, between their albums Privilege (1990) and Closer to God (1992). It was released in January 2018 under Fire Records.

Track listing
All words and music by Daniel Treacy

Personnel
Television Personalities 
Daniel Treacy - lead vocals, 6- and 12-string electric guitars
Jowe Head - bass guitar, electric and acoustic guitar, analogue synthesizer, autoharp, bowed psaltery, drum machine programming, percussion, backing vocals

References
 

2018 albums
Television Personalities albums